Decatropis is a genus of flowering plants belonging to the family Rutaceae.

Its native range is Mexico to Central America.

Species:

Decatropis bicolor 
Decatropis coulteri 
Decatropis paucijuga

References

Zanthoxyloideae
Zanthoxyloideae genera